Jelovik is a village in the municipality of Aranđelovac, Serbia.

People of Jelovik 
Jelovik is an anomaly to say the least, the population of Jelovik is on a constant decline. Jelovik's study's tell us this much. Jelovik is full of different demographics that all counter-balance each other. there is 47.5% females (178) and 52.5% males (197); based on the 2011 study.

References

Populated places in Šumadija District
Population